Zlodzieje zapalniczek - reedycja - the new version of Pidzama Porno's album, previously made in 1997. Recorded again and issued by SP Records, contains bonus tracks and videos. It is promoted with the single called “Czekając na trzęsienie ziemi”.

Track listing

Videos
 "Czekając na trzęsienie ziemi"

Personnel
Grabaż - vocal
Kozak - guitar, vocal
Dziadek - guitar
Kuzyn - drums
Julo - bass

Guests:
Tom Horn - keyboard
Lo - bass in "28 (one love)" (3)
Jacek Kąkolewski - bass(13,14 - demo versions, band member at that time)
Arkadiusz Kwiatkowski - trombone in "Ezoteryczny Poznań" (2)
Krzysztof Krakuski - trumpet in "Ezoteryczny Poznań" (2)
Wojciech Kamiński - sax in "Ezoteryczny Poznań" (2)

References 

Pidżama Porno albums